Neodymium aluminium borate  is a chemical compound with the chemical formula NdAl3(BO3)4.

Uses
It is used in optics.

References

Inorganic compounds
Neodymium compounds
Borates
Aluminium compounds